Ghostball was the first multipartite virus discovered. The virus was discovered in October 1989, by Friðrik Skúlason. The virus is capable of infecting both executable .COM-files and boot sectors.

The virus was written up based on code from two different viruses. The code that is capable of infecting COM files is stated to be inspired from a modified version of the Vienna virus. The section of the virus that is capable of infecting boot sectors is extracted from the Ping-Pong virus.

See also 
 Timeline of notable computer viruses and worms
 Comparison of computer viruses
 Computer virus
 Malware
 Multipartite virus

References 

DOS file viruses
Boot viruses
Hacking in the 1980s